Langurites is a genus of lizard beetles in the family Erotylidae. There are at least three described species in Langurites.

Species
These three species belong to the genus Langurites:
 Langurites apiciventris Casey
 Langurites lineatus (Laporte, 1832)
 Langurites superciliatus Casey

References

Further reading

 
 

Erotylidae
Articles created by Qbugbot